The Women's Tour Down Under (known for sponsorship reasons as the Santos Women's Tour Down Under) is an annual professional road bicycle racing for women in Australia. It is held in conjunction with the Tour Down Under.

From 2016, it was rated as UCI 2.2, from 2018 as UCI 2.1., from 2020 Women's UCI ProSeries  and from 2022 UCI Women's World Tour.

History 
Women's racing at the Tour Down Under began in 2011 as a series of exhibition criterium races and eventually formed part of the women's National Road Series (2015), with these races variously operating under guises deriving from the parent event's name.

In 2016, organisers developed a new UCI-classified event that carried the 'Women's Tour' name, and was ranked as a new UCI 2.2. stage race with international teams invited to compete. The event considers the 'Women's Tour Down Under' as having started in 2016.

Originally called the 'Santos Women's Tour' the first race was won by former Australian Champion Katrin Garfoot. From 2018, the race leaders and overall winner are awarded an Ochre Jersey as has been the tradition in the men's event since 2006.

The three subsequent races were won by Amanda Spratt, and in 2020 Ruth Winder became the first non-Australian and non Mitchelton–Scott (women's team) rider to win the event.

The race was not held in 2021 or 2022 due to the Covid-19 pandemic. However, an alternative National Road Series stage race was held under the name Festival of Cycling. The 2021 edition was won by Sarah Gigante and the 2022 edition was won by Ruby Roseman-Gannon.

In 2023 the race was elevated to Women's WorldTour level. The 2023 edition was won by Australian cyclist Grace Brown.

In 2023, Stuart O'Grady replaced Kimberley Conte as race director with the addition of two new assistant race directors Annette Edmondson and Carlee Taylor.

Women's Tour Down Under Winners

Classification leaders' jerseys

Predecessor women's racing events 
From 2011, women's racing commenced at the Tour Down Under, usually as small-scale criterium races at start and finish locations aligned to the men's race. The inaugural event known as the Rendition Homes-Santos Women's Cup was won by Chloe Hosking.

In 2012 the criterium series took place in Adelaide City, Prospect and Hyde Park and was won by Judith Arndt.

In 2013, the Santos Women's Cup was held in Adelaide City, Prospect and Hyde Park and was won by Kimberley Wells.

In 2014, the Santos Women's Cup was held in Adelaide City, Angaston and Prospect and was won by Loes Gunnewijk.

In 2015, the 'Santos Women's Tour' was a four-part race as part of Cycling Australia's National Road Series with stages running from Woodside-Murray Bridge, Adelaide city, Tanunda-Campbelltown, Victoria Park.

Previous Women's Tour & Women's Cup winners

Classification leaders jerseys

References

Cycle races in Australia
Recurring sporting events established in 2012
2012 establishments in Australia
Women's road bicycle races
Annual sporting events in Australia